Soul Cages is a Canadian short drama film, directed by Phillip Barker and released in 1999. Inspired by the old legend of The Soul Cages, in which the souls of drowned sailors are trapped in clay pots at the bottom of the ocean, the film adapts it to the present day by depicting the interactions between a photographer (Susanna Hood) and the clerk (Srinivas Krishna) processing her film in a one-hour photo lab, around the philosophical question of whether the souls of photographic subjects are trapped in the image.

The film premiered at the 1999 Toronto International Film Festival. It was later screened at the Local Heroes Film Festival in Winnipeg, where it won the Audience Choice Award, and at the 2000 Atlantic Film Festival, where it won the award for Best Canadian Short Film.

It received a Genie Award nomination for Best Live Action Short Drama at the 21st Genie Awards in 2001, and Luc Montpellier won the Canadian Society of Cinematographers award for Best Cinematography in a Dramatic Short in 2000.

References

External links
 

1999 films
1999 drama films
1999 short films
1990s English-language films
Canadian drama short films
1990s Canadian films